Reut Michaeli (born 17 April 2002) is an Israeli professional footballer who plays as a midfielder for the Israel women's national team.

Career 
She was scouted very young by the scouts of Hapoel Katamon Jerusalem She joined her academy in 2015 at just 13 years old.

She played in the men's sections of the professional club of Jerusalem until 2018.

In 2018, she joined the professional women's football club of the National Women's Football Academy. She made her first appearance in the women's professional football championship at just 16 years old.

After a season in the Academy club, she joined Ramat HaSharon in 2019.

In September 2020, she left Israel to join AEL Limassol in Cyprus.

In November 2020, following poor working conditions, she terminated her contract to engage with Israeli club Ramat HaSharon.

Honors 
 Best revelation of the Israeli Women's Premier League 2019–2020
 Champion of the Israeli Women's Premier League 2018–2019

References 

2002 births
Living people
Israeli women's footballers
Women's association football midfielders
Footballers from Jerusalem
Israel women's international footballers